Pipoyan (Armenian: Պիպոյան) is an Armenian surname that may refer to the following notable people:
Lilit Pipoyan (born 1955), Armenian musician, singer, and architect
Rima Pipoyan (born 1988), Armenian choreographer, director, dancer and dance teacher

Armenian-language surnames